Charles-Hugues Le Febvre de Saint-Marc (22 June 1698 – 20 November 1769) was an 18th-century French playwright and homme de lettres.

Saint-Marc is remembered for works of different genres, especially by editions of various authors such as the Mémoires by Feuquières, the Œuvres by Pavillon, Boileau, Chaulieu, etc., with notes and commentaries. In 1748, he wrote the libretto of an opera entitled le Pouvoir de l’Amour. He composed the 17th and 18th volumes and part of the 19th of the Pour et Contre by abbé Prévost.

Notes

Sources 
 A.-F.-F. Babault, Dictionnaire général des théâtres, t. 5, Paris, Babault, J. Capelle, Renaud Treuttel, Wurtz et Le Normant, 1810.

18th-century French dramatists and playwrights
18th-century French journalists
French opera librettists
1698 births
Writers from Paris
1769 deaths